The Golden Martín Fierro Award is presented annually by the Asociación de Periodistas de la Televisión y Radiofonía Argentina (APTRA). It is given to honor an Argentine individual with an outstanding career in the media of Argentina or a recent production of outstanding quality. APTRA described the standard as "the best among the best". It was first awarded in 1992 at the Martín Fierro Awards ceremony for works from 1991. It is a special award, unrelated to the regular ones, which are distributed in categories. A second award, the Platinum Martín Fierro Award, is selected by public poll among the previous recipients of the Golden award. This second award was created in 2009 for works from 2008, but there was no Platinum award for the 2013 ceremony. The awards for the cable television were split to their own ceremony, with its own Golden Martín Fierro in 2015.

The talk show Fax was the first recipient of the award, and, as of 2018, 100 días para enamorarse is the most recent. No recipient has received the award twice, but Nicolás Repetto, host of Fax, received a personal one in 2000. Facundo Arana, Julio Chávez, Mercedes Morán, Celeste Cid, Carla Peterson, Nancy Dupláa, Pablo Echarri, Diego Peretti and Gabriela Toscano have been lead actors of different works of fiction that received the award.

Winners
In the following table, the years are listed per APTRA convention, and generally correspond to the year when the productions were aired. The Martín Fierro award ceremonies are always held the following year. The ceremonies have no nominees for the Golden award, which is announced at the end once all the regular awards have been received. The award may be given to either a person with an outstanding career or recent production of outstanding quality. When the award is received by a production, the Starring column lists the people that worked in it, such as TV hosts or lead actors. The TV channel / Radio station column lists either the channel or station that aired the production, or the channel or station where the person worked at the year of the award.

Networks with most awards

Platinum awards

Cable television awards

References

External links
 APTRA 

Awards established in 1991
Argentine awards
Golden Martín Fierro Award winners
Golden Martín Fierro Award winners